Román Guillermo Meyer Falcón is a Mexican politician and member of the National Regeneration Movement. He was appointed to the Cabinet of Mexico as Secretary of Agrarian, Land, and Urban Development (SEDATU) by President Andrés Manuel López Obrador (AMLO) in December 2018.

Education
Román Meyer Falcón received his bachelor's degree in architecture from the Monterrey Institute of Technology and Higher Education, and a master's degree in Urban Management from the Polytechnic University of Catalonia in Barcelona, Spain. He has taught at the Universidad Iberoamericana.

Professional career
Co-founder of the firm Central Urbana, Meyer Falcón's projects focused on rescuing public spaces and working-class neighborhoods, public health, mobility, and public policies.

Meyer Falcón has worked at the Ministry of Health of Mexico City, where he carried out projects focused on improving the operation of the ministry and reducing costs.

As Secretary of Agrarian, Land, and Urban Development, Meyer Falcón has pushed for a new housing model that takes into account new social dynamics with a focus on human rights.

Family and personal life
Meyer Falcón's father is the historian Lorenzo Meyer, who is considered one of AMLO's principal ideologues. His mother is sociologist Romana Falcón.

References

External links
Román Meyer Falcón, Secretario de Desarrollo Agrario, Territorial y Urbano 

Mexican architects
Monterrey Institute of Technology and Higher Education alumni
Living people
21st-century Mexican politicians
Academic staff of Universidad Iberoamericana
Morena (political party) politicians
1983 births
Cabinet of Andrés Manuel López Obrador